The .505 Gibbs cartridge was designed by George Gibbs in 1911. The cartridge was originally known as the .505 Rimless Nitro Express. The C.I.P. refers to the cartridge as the 505 Mag. Gibbs in their publications. It is a .50 caliber (12.8 mm) rimless bottlenecked cartridge intended for magazine-fed rifles.

General information
While the .505 Gibbs has a greater case capacity than most modern cartridges, it is loaded to lower pressures. As .505 Gibbs was intended for hunting dangerous game in tropical environments, and due to the temperature sensitivity of cordite, the lower pressures provide a greater safety and reliability margin.

Barnes Bullets and Woodleigh Bullets are a few of the bullet manufacturers who produce component bullets for reloading in this caliber.

George Gibbs Ltd. (England) continues to manufacture .505 Gibbs rifles; other premium dangerous game rifle makers, such as Hartmann & Weiss  and Westley Richards build expensive and reliable .505 Gibbs rifles on Mauser 98 actions.

Ceska Zbrojovka (CZ) currently manufactures the Safari Classics rifle for this cartridge. Doumoulin Herstal SA of Belgium offers the cartridge in their White Hunter model.

As of 2019, Federal, Kynoch, Norma, and Swift are offering factory loaded ammunition in .505 Gibbs. Bullets for reloading are available from Barnes, Cutting Edge Bullets, North Fork Bullets, and Woodleigh Bullets.

Design and specifications
The .505 Gibbs is one of the most voluminous cases designed. The large volume was required as the cartridge was designed to burn cordite as its propellant. The C.I.P. has published specifications for the cartridge.

Sporting use
The .505 Gibbs is a niche cartridge designed for hunting heavy, thick-skinned dangerous game animals, such as cape buffalo, elephant, and rhino.

In literature
The cartridge's claim to fame was its use by the fictional character, Robert Wilson, the hunter of Ernest Hemingway's short story "The Short Happy Life of Francis Macomber".

See also
 .338 Xtreme
 .408 Chey Tac
 .50 BMG
 .500 Jeffery
 .500 Nitro Express
 .500 No. 2 Express
 .577/.500 Magnum Nitro Express
 .577 Tyrannosaur
 12 mm caliber
 Hartmann & Weiss
 List of rifle cartridges

References

 Current African Cartridges: The 505 Gibbs
 Barnes, Frank C. (2006) “505 Gibbs” Cartridges of the World 11th Ed.Iola WI. Skinner p. 403

External links
 AccurateReloading.Com on the 505 Gibbs
 Vigilance Rifles - makers of the only semi-automatic rifle chambered in 505 Gibbs
 Current African Cartridges: the .505 Gibbs

 gibbsgunmakers.com

Pistol and rifle cartridges
British firearm cartridges
George Gibbs cartridges